Cunninghamia konishii is an endangered species of tree in the cypress family, Cupressaceae. It is native to southeast China (Fujian), Taiwan, Laos and Vietnam.

Taxonomy
Although C. konishii is treated as a distinct species by many sources, it has also been suggested that it is conspecific with C. lanceolata.

References

Cupressaceae
Flora of Laos
Flora of Fujian
Flora of Taiwan
Flora of Vietnam
Taxa named by Bunzō Hayata